Rev. Joshua Leavitt (September 8, 1794, Heath, Massachusetts – January 16, 1873, Brooklyn, New York) was an American Congregationalist minister and former lawyer who became a prominent writer, editor and publisher of abolitionist literature. He was also a spokesman for the Liberty Party and a prominent campaigner for cheap postage. Leavitt served as editor of The Emancipator, The New York Independent, The New York Evangelist, and other periodicals. He was the first secretary of the American Temperance Society and co-founder of the New York City Anti-Slavery Society.

Biography
Born in Heath, Massachusetts, in the Berkshires, Leavitt attended Yale College, where he graduated at age twenty. He subsequently studied law and practiced for a time in Putney, Vermont, before matriculating at the Yale Theological Seminary for a three-year course of study. He was subsequently ordained as a Congregational clergyman at Stratford, Connecticut.  After four years in Stratford, Rev. Leavitt decamped for New York City, where he first became secretary of the American Seamens' Friend Society, and began his 44-year career as editor of Sailors' Magazine. Thus was Leavitt launched on his career as social reformer, temperance spokesman, editor, abolitionist and religious proselytizer.

Leavitt was heavily involved in a series of high-profile anti-slavery cases, including the escape of the slave Basil Dorsey from Maryland into Massachusetts (Leavitt aided Dorsey's passage northward, and members of the extended Leavitt family helped shelter Dorsey in Massachusetts), as well as the La Amistad case, in which enslaved Africans on a Spanish ship rebelled and took control. Leavitt played a pivotal role in the Amistad events, when on September 4, 1839, he, Lewis Tappan, and Simeon Jocelyn formed the Amistad Committee to raise funds for the defense of the Amistad captives.

One of Leavitt's major accomplishments was helping to provide the intellectual underpinnings of the abolitionist argument through his writing and publishing. In 1841, for instance, Leavitt published his "Financial Power of Slavery", a compelling document which argued that the South was draining the national economy through its reliance on slavery.

The Christian Lyre
Leavitt published The Christian Lyre in 1830, the "first American tunebook to take the form of a modern hymnal, with music for every hymn (melody and bass only) and the multistanza hymns printed in full, under or beside the music". It later became one of the standard tunebooks used in the 1830s New England Revivalism movement.

Family
Rev. Joshua Leavitt came from a long line of religious figures. His father was Col. Roger Leavitt, a wealthy landowner and Massachusetts legislator, and his mother Chloe (Maxwell) Leavitt. His grandfather was the Congregational minister Rev. Jonathan Leavitt, a 1758 graduate of Yale and pastor of Charlemont, Massachusetts. The Leavitt family had ties to religious institutions since Joshua Leavitt's ancestor John Leavitt served as founding deacon of Old Ship Church in Hingham, Massachusetts, and his ancestor Rev. Thomas Hooker had left the Massachusetts Bay Colony to found the state of Connecticut.

Rev. Joshua Leavitt's son William was a Congregational minister in Hudson, New York. Aside from Rev. Joshua Leavitt, other members of the Leavitt family were prominent abolitionists.  The National Park service lists two Leavitt family properties in upstate Massachusetts – the Hart and Mary Leavitt House, as well as the Roger Hooker and Keziah Leavitt House – on its National Underground Railroad historic sites tour. The entire extended family of Rev. Joshua Leavitt can be considered ardent – and active – abolitionist sympathizers.

See also
Roger Hooker Leavitt
Hart Leavitt
Underground Railroad

Notes

References

Further reading
 The Road to Freedom: Anti-Slavery Activity in Greenfield, Greenfield Human Rights Commission, the Greenfield Historical Commission, starrcenter.washcoll.edu
 The Amistad Case, National Portrait Gallery, Washington, D.C.
 Joshua Leavitt, Evangelical Abolitionist, Hugh Davis, Louisiana State University Press, Baton Rouge, La., 1990,

External links
Portrait of Joshua Leavitt, Massachusetts Historical Society
 
 
 Finance of Cheap Postage, Joshua Leavitt, Secretary of the Boston Cheap Postage Association, Boston, 1849
The Christian Lyre, Joshua Leavitt, New York, 1833
The Monroe Doctrine, Joshua Leavitt, New York, 1863
 Easy Lessons in Reading for the Use of the Younger Classes, Joshua Leavitt, Keene, New Hampshire, 1830
The Amistad Case, The National Portrait Gallery, Washington, D.C.

1794 births
1873 deaths
People from Heath, Massachusetts
Religious leaders from New York City
Leavitt family
Massachusetts lawyers
American Congregationalist ministers
19th-century American newspaper publishers (people)
American newspaper editors
American male journalists
American temperance activists
Underground Railroad people
Yale Law School alumni
Yale Divinity School alumni
19th-century Congregationalist ministers
Massachusetts Libertyites
Activists from New York City
Lawyers from New York City
Yale College alumni
Congregationalist abolitionists
19th-century American lawyers
19th-century American clergy